Robert Lang Studios is a recording studio in Shoreline, Washington, United States. Numerous bands have recorded at Robert Lang Studios since 1974 including Nirvana, Alice in Chains, Foo Fighters, The Blood Brothers, Candlebox, and Bush.

In late January 1994, Nirvana recorded their last known studio recording at Robert Lang Studios. It was at this session that "You Know You're Right" was recorded. In October of the same year, Dave Grohl, formerly of Nirvana, recorded Foo Fighters' self-titled debut album. Later, the Foo Fighters returned to the studio in 2014 to record "Subterranean" and showcased the song in the penultimate episode of their 2014 HBO rockumentary mini-series Foo Fighters Sonic Highways.

In more recent years, Robert Lang Studios has recorded artists such as Portugal. The Man, Macklemore & Ryan Lewis, and Ke$ha.

In 2016, the studio opened an academy for young and aspiring musicians. Robert Lang Studios Academy offers structured program for students to work with bands, professional engineers, producers, and visiting industry leaders in workshops and seminars.

Recorded albums and artists (selection)

 Seminar (1989) - Sir Mix-A-Lot
 Hammerbox (1991) - Hammerbox
 Heart and Lungs (1992) - Truly
 Diva (1992) - My Sister's Machine
 Exit at the Axis (1992) - Sky Cries Mary
 Road Life Goes On (1992) - Sweet Water
 Candlebox (1993) - Candlebox
 Desire Walks On (1993) - Heart
 Foo Fighters (1994) - Foo Fighters
 Setting the Woods on Fire (1994) - The Walkabouts (mixed)
 Ball-Hog or Tugboat? (1995) - Mike Watt
 On the Cover (1995) - MxPx (mixed)
 Nevermore (1995) - Nevermore
 Spanaway (1995) - Seaweed
 Infrared Riding Hood (1995) - Tad
 The Presidents of the United States of America (1995) - The Presidents of the United States of America (mixed)
 Fast Stories... from Kid Coma (1995) - Truly
 Honky's Ladder (1996) - The Afghan Whigs
 Amazing Disgrace (1996) - The Posies
 Vary (1997) - Damien Jurado
 Black Love (1997) - The Afghan Whigs
 Slowly Going the Way of the Buffalo (1998) - MxPx
 Second Coming (1998) - Second Coming
 How It Feels to Be Something On (1998) - Sunny Day Real Estate
 Nothing Safe (1999) - Alice in Chains
 Letters & Drawings(1999) - Damien Jurado
 Rehearsals for Departure (1999) - Damien Jurado
 Late at Night (1999) - Dover
 The Ever Passing Moment (2000) - MxPx
 Dead Heart in a Dead World (2000) - Nevermore
 River (2001) - Izzy Stradlin
 Field Songs (2001) - Mark Lanegan
 Shameless (2001) - Therapy?
 You Know You're Right (2002) - Nirvana (single)
 Tribe (2003) - Queensrÿche
 Leviathan (2004) - Mastodon
 With the Lights Out (2004) - Nirvana
 Good Health (2004) - Pretty Girls Make Graves
 Crimes (2004) - The Blood Brothers
 Welcome to Jamrock (2005) - Damien Marley
 Little by Little... (2005) - Harvey Danger
 O' God, the Aftermath (2005) - Norma Jean
 Take Fountain (2005) -The Wedding Present
 The Essential Alice in Chains (2006) - Alice in Chains
 World Waits (2006) - Jeremy Enigk
 Menos El Oso (2006) - Minus the Bear (mixed)
 Fingerprints (2006) - Peter Frampton
 Young Machetes (2006) - The Blood Brothers
 Planet of Ice (2007) - Minus the Bear
 Lucky (2007) - Nada Surf
 Threes (2007) - Sparta
 Manipulator (2007) - The Fall of Troy
 Narrow Stairs (2008) - Death Cab for Cutie
 Plans (2008) - Death Cab for Cutie
 Get It Together (2008) - Supersuckers
 Hate Culture (2008) - William Control
 In Name and Blood (2009) - Murder City Devils
 Funstyle (2010) - Liz Phair
 The Telephantasm (2010) - Soundgarden (mixed)
 Noir (2010) - William Control
 Allen Stone (2011) - Allen Stone
 Live on I-5 (2011) - Soundgarden (mixed)
 Reborn in Defiance (2011) - Biohazard (mixed)
 The Classic Album Selection (2012) - Soundgarden (mixed)
 North (2013) - Something Corporate
 Sonic Highways (2014) - Foo Fighters
 Downtown (2015) - Macklemore & Ryan Lewis (single)
 This Unruly Mess I've Made (2016) - Macklemore & Ryan Lewis
 Praying (2017) - Kesha (single)
 Woodstock (2017) - Portugal. The Man
 Cry Cry Cry (2017) - Wolf Parade
 Blend Inn (2018) - Hockey Dad

References

External links

Recording studios in Washington (state)